Hammond is a city in Lake County, Indiana, United States. It is part of the Chicago metropolitan area, and the only city in Indiana to border Chicago. First settled in the mid-19th century, it is one of the oldest cities of northern Lake County. As of the 2020 United States census, it is also the largest in population. The 2020 population was 77,879, replacing Gary as the most populous city in Lake County. From north to south, Hammond runs from Lake Michigan down to the Little Calumet River; from east to west along its southern border, it runs from the Illinois state line to Cline Avenue. The city is traversed by numerous railroads and expressways, including the South Shore Line, Borman Expressway, and Indiana Toll Road. Notable local landmarks include the parkland around Wolf Lake and the Horseshoe Hammond riverboat casino. Part of the Rust Belt, Hammond has been industrial almost from its inception, but is also home to a Purdue University campus and numerous historic districts that showcase the residential and commercial architecture of the early 20th century.

History

The first permanent residents arrived around 1847 to settle on land between the Grand and Little Calumet Rivers, on the south end of Lake Michigan. Those first residents were German farmers newly arrived from Europe looking for land and opportunity. Before that time, the area was a crossroad for Indian tribes, explorers, stagecoach lines and supply lines to the West. Convenient location and abundant fresh water from Lake Michigan led to the beginning of Hammond's industrialization in 1869 with the George H. Hammond Company meat-packing plant following merchants and farmers to the area. Hammond was incorporated on April 21, 1884, and was named after the Detroit butcher. 

Hammond is one of the oldest cities in Lake County, with Crown Point being the oldest, established in 1834.
According to the Encyclopedia of Chicago, George Henry Hammond, a pioneer in the use of refrigerated railcars for the transport of fresh meat, first used this method with his small packing company in Detroit, Michigan. In 1868, Hammond received a patent for a refrigerator car design. In the early 1870s, he built a new plant in northern Indiana along the tracks of the Michigan Central Railroad. By 1873, the George H. Hammond Co. was selling $1 million worth of meat a year; by 1875, sales were nearly $2 million. The company's large packing house in Hammond rivaled those located at the Union Stock Yard in Chicago. By the middle of the 1880s, when it built a new plant in Omaha, Nebraska, Hammond was slaughtering over 100,000 cattle a year and owned a fleet of 800 refrigerator cars. After Hammond died in 1886, the company became less important and no longer challenged the giant Chicago packers, who acquired Hammond at the turn of the century and merged it into their National Packing Co.

The Hammond Whiting & East Chicago Electric Railway Company trolley service ran from 1893 to 1940.

The downtown Hammond shopping district along State Street and Hohman Avenue included major chains such as Sears and J. C. Penney. The largest stores in downtown were the Goldblatt's and E.C. Minas department stores. The E.C. Minas store was constructed in 1894 and was in business until August 1984. The building which housed the Goldblatt's store had been purchased by the Chicago-based retailer in 1931 and operated until 1982 when it closed due to bankruptcy.

The Pullman Standard Car Company built M4 Sherman tanks in Hammond during World War II.
 
Architect Victor Gruen designed the Woodmar Mall in the Woodmar neighborhood. The mall opened in 1954 and was anchored by a Carson Pirie Scott and Co. store.

According to the 1960 United States Census Hammond's population reached a record high of 111,698 residents. Hammond, like other industrial cities in the Rust Belt, went into decline during the 1970s and 1980s, with the city's population plunging to 94,000 in 1980, and 83,000 in 2000. However, Hammond's economy was more diversified than neighboring Gary, Indiana, East Chicago, Indiana, and the south side of Chicago, which all relied on heavy industry (primarily steel production). Hammond's economy, on the other hand, depended on light manufacturing, transportation & warehousing, retail, banking & insurance, healthcare, hospitality & food service, and construction. In 1981, a toxic flood in Gary led Hammond to erect a barrier on 165th Street, one of several roads connecting the two cities, which led to lasting tensions with Gary.

Prominent manufacturing companies in Hammond include Unilever's soap factory, Atlas Tube, Cargill food processing, Munster Steel, Lear Seating Corporation, Jupiter Aluminum, Tri-State Automation, and Dover Chemical. Warehousing and storage is also prominent, with ExxonMobil and Marathon Petroleum having large oil storage facilities, and FedEx has a distribution center. Large railroad marshalling yards are also present in the city, with the Indiana Harbor Belt Railroad's headquarters in the city. The State Line Generating Plant operated on the Indiana-Illinois state line from 1929 to 2012, and was demolished in 2014.

The Empress Casino opened in Hammond in June 1996 and was replaced with the Horseshoe Hammond casino in 2001.

In February 2006, the decision was made to demolish Woodmar Mall except for the Carson's store. The Hammond Redevelopment Commission announced plans in June 2016 for a $12 million sports complex to be built on the site of the former mall. The Carson's store closed in 2018, and was demolished in 2019, as part of its parent company's liquidation.

Geography
The city sits within the boundaries of the former Lake Chicago, and much of its land area consists of former dune and swale terrain that was subsequently leveled. Most of the city is on sandy soil with a layer of black topsoil that varies from non-existent to several feet (a meter or more) thick. Much of the exposed sand was removed for purposes such as industrial use to make concrete and glass. 

Neighborhoods
Lakefront
Marina District
Five Points
Robertsdale
Water Gardens
North Hammond
Pulaski Park
Downtown Hammond
Central Hammond
South Hammond
Woodmar
Schleicher
Hessville

Lakes and rivers
 Grand Calumet River (partial)
 Lake George
 Lake Michigan (partial)
 Little Calumet River (partial)
 Oxbow Lake
 Wolf Lake (partial)

Adjacent cities, towns and villages

Illinois
 Burnham
 Calumet City
 Chicago
 Lansing

Indiana
 East Chicago
 Gary
 Griffith
 Highland
 Munster
 Whiting

Demographics

2020 census

Note: the US Census treats Hispanic/Latino as an ethnic category. This table excludes Latinos from the racial categories and assigns them to a separate category. Hispanics/Latinos can be of any race.

2010 census
As of the 2010 United States Census, there were 80,830 people, 29,949 households, and 19,222 families residing in the city. The racial makeup of the city was 59.4% White, 22.5% African American, 0.5% Native American, 1.0% Asian, 13.3% from other races, and 3.3% from two or more races. Hispanic or Latino of any race were 34.1% of the population.

There were 29,949 households, of which 36.2% had children under the age of 18 living with them, 37.0% were married couples living together, 19.7% had a female householder with no husband present, 7.5% had a male householder with no wife present, and 35.8% were non-families. 30.3% of all households were made up of individuals, and 9.7% had someone living alone who was 65 years of age or older. The average household size was 2.67 and the average family size was 3.36.

The median age in the city was 33.3 years. 27.6% of residents were under the age of 18; 10.1% were between the ages of 18 and 24; 27.3% were from 25 to 44; 24.2% were from 45 to 64; and 10.7% were 65 years of age or older. The gender makeup of the city was 49.0% male and 51.0% female.

2000 census
As of the 2000 United States Census, there were 83,048 people, 32,026 households and 20,880 families residing in the city. The racial makeup of the city was 72.35% White, 14.57% African American, 0.41% Native American, 0.46% Asian, 0.08% Pacific Islander, 9.32% from other races, and 2.81% from two or more races. Hispanic or Latino of any race were 21.04% of the population.

There were 32,026 households, out of which 31.8% had children under the age of 18 living with them, 42.9% were married couples living together, 16.9% had a female householder with no husband present, and 34.8% were non-families. 29.7% of all households were made up of individuals, and 10.9% had someone living alone who was 65 years of age or older. The average household size was 2.58 and the average family size was 3.23.

In the city, the population was spread out, with 27.3% under the age of 18, 9.8% from 18 to 24, 30.1% from 25 to 44, 19.8% from 45 to 64, and 13.0% who were 65 years of age or older. The median age was 34 years. For every 100 females, there were 95.3 males. For every 100 females age 18 and over, there were 92.2 males.

The median income for a household in the city was $35,528, and the median income for a family was $42,221. Males had a median income of $35,778 versus $25,180 for females. The per capita income for the city was $16,254. About 12.0% of families and 14.3% of the population were below the poverty line, including 19.7% of those under age 18 and 9.3% of those age 65 or over.

Economy

Major employers
According to the city, those businesses employing 200 or more employees in Hammond are:

Arts and culture

National Register of Historic Places
The following single properties and national historic districts are listed on the National Register of Historic Places:
 Morse Dell Plain House and Garden
 Forest-Ivanhoe Residential Historic District
 Forest-Moraine Residential Historic District
 Forest-Southview Residential Historic District
 Glendale Park Historic District
 Hohman Avenue Commercial Historic District
 Indi-Illi Park Historic District
 Northern States Life Insurance Company
 Pullman-Standard Historic District
 Roselawn-Forest Heights Historic District
 Southmoor Apartment Hotel
 State Bank of Hammond Building
 State Street Commercial Historic District
 George John Wolf House

Public libraries
Hammond Public Library, located at 564 State Street, includes the Suzanne G. Long Local History Room. The system used to operate the E.B. Hayward Branch at 1212 172nd Street and the Howard Branch at 7047 Grand Avenue. Both branches have since been closed. The Hammond Public Library was the first library in the state to form a recognized union, a local of AFSCME. Patricia E. Robinson was the first president of the library union.

Sports
Hammond was defeated by the team from Taipei, Taiwan in the 1972 Little League World Series.

Past teams
Hammond Rollers, an American Basketball Association team founded in 2006, was sold to the owner of the Quad City Riverhawks the same year. The team relocated and became the Sauk Valley Rollers of Rock Falls, Illinois.
Hammond Ciesar All-Americans (1938–41) and Hammond Calumet Buccaneers (1948–49), were professional basketball teams in the National Basketball League. Baseball Hall of Famer Lou Boudreau and UCLA basketball coach John Wooden both played for the Ciesar All-Americans.

The Hammond Pros (1920–1924)
The Hammond Pros was one of the earliest professional football teams in the United States. When the American Professional Football League was formed in 1920, the Hammond Pros was a charter member, as it also was when the league changed its name to National Football League in 1922. However, four years later, when the NFL decided to reduce the number of teams, it did so by simply folding smaller franchises. The Hammond Pros never played a home game in Hammond.

During the four years of the Hammond Pros' existence, the NFL had nine African-American players, six of whom played for the Pros. The NFL's first African-American head coach was Hall-of-Famer coach Fritz Pollard of the Pros.

Government
Hammond is incorporated as a city under Indiana law. It therefore has a mayor and a nine-member city council. Hammond's City Hall is located at 5925 Calumet Avenue. The Hammond City Council has meetings scheduled for the second and fourth Mondays of each month.

The city maintains a city court on the second floor of the City Hall, exercising a limited jurisdiction within Lake County. The court handles not only local ordinance violations and certain minor criminal matters, but also a significant portion of the debt collection and eviction actions brought in Lake County.

City Council

Janet Venecz (D, At Large), President
Katrina D. Alexander (D, At Large)
Daniel P. Spitale (D, At Large)
Mark Kalwinski (D, 1st)
Pete Torres (D, 2nd)
Barry Tyler, Jr. (D, 3rd)
William Emerson, Sr. (D, 4th)
David Woerpel (D, 5th)
Scott Rakos (D, 6th)

List of mayors

Education

School City of Hammond
Hammond is served by the School City of Hammond, a school corporation under Indiana state law that is independent of the civil city.

In June 2021, the School City of Hammond permanently closed two junior/senior High Schools: Donald E. Gavit and George Rogers Clark, first opened in the 1930s and 1960s respectively.

 High schools
 Area Career Center
 Hammond High School
 Morton High School
 George Rogers Clark High School (Closed 2021)
 Gavit High School (Closed 2021)
 Middle schools
 George Rogers Clark Middle School (Closed 2021)
 Henry W. Eggers Middle School
 Gavit Middle School (Closed 2021)
 Scott Middle School
 Elementary schools
 Columbia Elementary School
 Edison Elementary School
 Benjamin Franklin Elementary School
 Warren G. Harding Elementary School
 Joseph Hess Elementary School
 Washington Irving Elementary School
 Thomas Jefferson Elementary School
 Kenwood Elementary School
 Lafayette Elementary School
 Lincoln Elementary School
 Maywood Elementary School
 Morton Elementary School
 Frank O'Bannon Elementary School
 Lew Wallace Elementary School
 Charter schools
 Hammond Academy of Science and Technology (6–12)

Privately owned and operated schools

Catholic schools are under the Roman Catholic Diocese of Gary.

St. Catherine of Siena, a Catholic elementary school, opened prior to 1949. Prior to 2009 its enrollment had declined, with 130 students that year, and its financial state had deteriorated. The school closed in 2009.

Colleges and universities
 Calumet College of St. Joseph
 Kaplan University
 Purdue University Northwest

Infrastructure

Transportation

Most of Hammond's streets are laid out in a grid pattern similar to Chicago's streets. While Madison Street in Chicago acts as the reference point for north–south street numbering the first "1" is removed; this makes what would be a five digit address number in Illinois into a four digit address number in Hammond. The state line is used as the reference point for east–west street numbering.

Other cities and towns in Northwest Indiana that use the Hammond numbering system are Whiting, Munster and Highland. Dyer also uses the Hammond numbering system but the first number removed from the north–south streets is a "2," as by that point the Illinois numbers across the state line start with the number 2 (Munster's street numbers start with a "1" north of the Dyer line, making them 5 digits); and East Chicago uses the canal located in the middle of the city as the east–west reference point, while embodying Hammond's numbering system for the north–south streets.

I-90 – Indiana Toll Road, exits (listed northwest to southeast):
Indianapolis Boulevard – U.S. 12/20/41
Calumet Avenue – U.S. 41
Cline Avenue – State Road 912

I-80/94 – Borman Expressway, exits (listed west to east):
Calumet Avenue – U.S. 41 North
Indianapolis Boulevard – U.S. 41 South/State Road 152
Kennedy Avenue
Cline Avenue – State Road 912

Public transportation

The South Shore Line, a Chicago to South Bend, Indiana commuter rail line, has a station on Hohman Avenue. It is operated by the Northern Indiana Commuter Transportation District.

Amtrak, the national passenger rail system, provides twice-daily service in both directions, operating its Wolverine through the Hammond–Whiting station between Chicago and Pontiac, Michigan, just north of Detroit.

The nearest commercial airport is Chicago Midway International Airport about 25 miles away in Chicago.

Bus transit was provided by the Northwest Indiana Regional Bus Authority, which assumed responsibility from the city's Hammond Transit System in 2010, establishing EasyGo Lake Transit system in its place. All EasyGo buses were discontinued on June 30, 2012 due to a lack of funding. In addition, Pace routes 350 and 364 and GPTC Tri-City Connection Route 12 from Gary, Indiana stop at Hammond's Dan Rabin Transit Plaza.

Medical centers and hospitals
The only hospital in Hammond is Franciscan St. Margaret Health on Stateline Road, across the street from Calumet City, Illinois. It is an accredited chest pain center serving Northwest Indiana and the south suburbs of Chicago. The hospital was founded in late 1898 and was originally called St. Margaret Hospital, later merging with Our Lady Of Mercy Hospital in Dyer, Indiana, in the 1990s and was part of the former Sisters of St. Francis Health Services.

Utilities

Electricity and Natural gas – Nearly all of the electricity and natural gas used in Hammond is produced by NIPSCO, a NiSource company.
Water – Water service for nearly all consumers of water in the city is provided by the Hammond Water Department, a state-owned utility that is operated by the civil city government.

Notable people

Sister city
Galați, Romania (since 1997)

See also 

Hammond Indiana Barrier Controversy

References

External links

 City of Hammond, Indiana website

 
1884 establishments in Indiana
Chicago metropolitan area
Cities in Indiana
Cities in Lake County, Indiana
Northwest Indiana
Populated places established in 1884
Indiana populated places on Lake Michigan
Majority-minority cities and towns in Indiana